"Handle with Care" is the tenth episode of the sixth season of the post-apocalyptic horror television series Fear the Walking Dead, the 79th episode overall,  "Handle with Care" was released on the streaming platform AMC+ on April 22, 2021, in the United States and aired on television on AMC three days later, on April 25, 2021.

A threat worse than Virginia is on the horizon. Morgan (Lennie James) calls for unity and invites the leaders of all survivor camps to his settlement, tasking Daniel (Ruben Blades) to keep the peace. However, Daniel will need to face his own challenges in hopes of protecting his friends.

Plot 
In the present, Daniel (Ruben Blades) is taking a cognitive test inside a jail cell. In a series of flash-backs, Morgan (Lennie James) invites Sherry (Christine Evangelista) and Strand (Colman Domingo) to Valley Town to discuss a possible new threat. Daniel is tasked with keeping their weapons while they're inside the community, and secures them in a locked shack. Grace (Karen David) begins to feel contractions. Morgan takes Althea's SWAT truck to retrieve medical supplies, and leaves Daniel in charge of the community.

Daniel leads a meeting with Dakota (Zoe Colletti) to obtain information about this new threat, which is the group who attacked Tank Town. Everyone debates among themselves, believing there is an infiltrator in the group. The discussion ends when there is an explosion, which attracts several walkers to the valley.

Daniel goes to the weapons shack and discovers that all the weapons are missing. He tells Charlie (Alexa Nisenson) and Grace to hide and wait for Morgan to arrive with Althea's truck to eliminate the walkers. Daniel intentionally lets several walkers enter the community to discover who has the weapons, and when a walker is about to kill Dwight (Austin Amelio), Strand saves him by using a pistol. Daniel targets Strand as the suspect of hiding the weapons.

Daniel locks up Strand and demands to know where the weapons are, but Strand insists he is innocent. When Daniel is about to kill Strand, Morgan returns and kills the walkers with Althea's truck. The group discovers that Daniel had taken the weapons, and he is locked in the cell. June (Jenna Elfman) is revealed to be the one interrogating Daniel in order to get a medical diagnosis, and believes he has a psychological disorder. As the groups leave the valley, Dakota recalls Virginia saying the enemy is hiding underground. Strand offers Daniel a place to live in Lawton, and he accepts.

Reception

Critical reception 
David S.E. Zapanta from Den of Geek! rate the episode 4 out of 5 and wrote: "I’m glad Fear is giving these original characters their due. As much as I love the newer arrivals, like Morgan, it’s good to acknowledge the characters (and their many defining imperfections) that got us here in the first place." Erik Kain of Forbes had mixed opinions of the episode, writing, "Not a terrible episode, not an episode I’d watch twice. They really need to thin the herd, and not just by killing the show’s best characters. Hell, my vote goes to Al’s stupid SWAT van. That thing has to go. It should never have been introduced in the first place." Writing for "TV Fanatic", Paul Daily gave the episode 4.75 out of 5 and wrote: "Daniel Salazar is the best-written character on TV. ... [He] has managed to survive the mass cast exodus in the seasons since [the first]." Emily Hannemann of TV Insider gave the episode a 4.5 out of 5, writing "I'm looking forward to seeing where Daniel's story goes from here. Especially now that he's with Strand."

Ratings 
The episode was seen by 1.10 million viewers in the United States on its original air date, below the previous episodes.

References

External links

 "Handle with Care" at AMC.com
 

2021 American television episodes
Fear the Walking Dead (season 6) episodes